The Zerewitinoff determination or Zerevitinov determination is a quantitative chemical test for the determination of active hydrogens in a chemical substance. A sample is treated with the Grignard reagent, methylmagnesium iodide, which reacts with any acidic hydrogen atom to form methane. This gas can be determined quantitatively by measuring its volume. For example:

References

External links 
 example from polyurethane chemistry

Chemical tests